Aphanotorulus phrixosoma is a dubious species of catfish in the family Loricariidae. It is native to South America, where it occurs in the upper Amazon River basin. The species reaches 10.1 cm (4 inches) SL. It is believed to be a facultative air-breather.

A. phrixosoma was originally described as Plecostomus phrixosoma by Henry Weed Fowler in 1940, although it was transferred to the genus Squaliforma (now considered invalid) after the genus' designation by I. J. H. Isbrücker, I. Seidel, J. Michels, E. Schraml, and A. Werner in 2001. In 2004, Jonathan W. Armbruster classified the species within Hypostomus instead of Squaliforma. In 2016, following a review of Isorineloricaria and Aphanotorulus by C. Keith Ray and Armbruster (both of Auburn University), the species was reclassified as a member of Aphanotorulus, although FishBase still lists the species as Squaliforma phrixosoma and lists Aphanotorulus phrixosoma as a synonym.

A. phrixosoma is of questionable validity, as it is currently known only from a single specimen that is believed by Ray and Armbruster to be a hybrid between Aphanotorulus horridus and Aphanotorulus unicolor, as it was collected in an area where A. horridus and A. unicolor are sympatric and extensive sampling efforts near the type locality have yielded no additional specimens.

References 

Loricariidae
Fish described in 1940